Heretaunga is a former New Zealand parliamentary electorate, in the city of Upper Hutt, that existed from 1954 until 1996.

Population centres
There was no adjustments in the number of electorates between the South and North Islands, but the law changes resulted in boundary adjustments to almost every electorate through the 1952 electoral redistribution; only five electorates were unaltered. Five electorates were reconstituted and the Heretaunga electorate was newly created, and a corresponding six electorates were abolished; all of these in the North Island.

The Heretaunga electorate was urban and was based on Heretaunga, a suburb of Upper Hutt in the northern Hutt Valley. Other places included Haywards and Birchville.

History
The electorate originated in 1954, and lasted to 1996, when with the introduction of MMP it was replaced by Rimutaka.

Up to 1990 when Peter McCardle won the seat for National, the Labour Party held Heretaunga. In 1993, McCardle narrowly held the seat against a challenge from Labour candidate Heather Simpson (who went on to become Helen Clark's Chief of Staff, known as H2 – Clark was H1). Subsequently, McCardle left the National Party in 1996 and joined New Zealand First.

Members of Parliament
Key

Election results

1993 election

1990 election

1987 election

1984 election

1981 election

1978 election

1975 election

1972 election

1969 election

1966 election

1963 election

1960 election

1957 election

1954 election

Notes

References

Historical electorates of New Zealand
Politics of the Wellington Region
Upper Hutt
1954 establishments in New Zealand
1996 disestablishments in New Zealand